The men's individual archery event was one of 5 archery events at the 2020 Summer Olympics. It is being held at Yumenoshima Park. There were 64 competitors from 40 nations, with nations having either 1 or 3 archers.

Background

This is the 13th consecutive appearance of the event, which has been held every Games since archery returned to the Olympic program in 1972. 

Six of the 8 quarterfinalists from the 2016 Games returned: silver medalist Jean-Charles Valladont of France, bronze medalist Brady Ellison of the United States, fourth-place finisher Sjef van den Berg of the Netherlands, and quarterfinalists Mauro Nespoli of Italy, Taylor Worth of Australia, and Takaharu Furukawa of Japan. Furukawa had been the silver medalist in 2012. Ellison was the world record holder for the 72-arrow ranking round as well as the 2019 World Champion.

Qualification 

64 archers qualify for the men's archery events. The 12 National Olympic Committees (NOCs) that qualify for the men's team event (including the host, Japan) enter the 3 team members in the individual event as well. Otherwise, NOCs may qualify a maximum of 1 archer in men's individual. There are quota spots available at various tournaments, including the World Championships, multiple continental events, and a final qualification tournament. There are also two Tripartite Commission invitational spots.

Competition format

As with the other archery events, the men's individual is a recurve archery event, held under the World Archery-approved 70-meter distance and rules. Competition begins with a ranking round, in which each archer shoots 72 arrows. The scores from the ranking round are used to seed the archers into a single-elimination bracket. The knockout matches used the set system introduced in 2012. Each match consists of up to 5 sets of 3 arrows per archer. The archer with the best score in each set wins the set, earning 2 points. If the score is tied, each archer receives 1 point. The first archer to 6 points wins the match. If the match is tied 5–5 after 5 sets, a single tie-breaker arrow is to be used with the closest to center winning.

Records 
Prior to the competition, the world and Olympic records were as follows.

72 arrow ranking round

Schedule

All times are Japan Standard Time (UTC+9)

The schedule for the men's individual event covers five separate days of competition.

Results

Ranking round

The ranking round was held on 23 July 2021.

Competition bracket

Section 1

Section 2

Section 3

Section 4

Finals

References

Archery at the 2020 Summer Olympics
Men's events at the 2020 Summer Olympics